Opera South is the name of a semi-professional British opera company based on the borders of Surrey, Hampshire, and West Sussex.

Specializing in staging lesser-known operas, the company was founded in 1984 as Opera Omnibus at Haslemere and was soon incorporated as a registered charity (1985) and limited company (1986). The company rebranded itself as Opera South in the first years of the 21st century. In 2005 the Guildford Philharmonic Orchestra joined the company and plays at the fully staged productions. The company is currently presided over by Ann Murray.

References

External links
Opera South official site
Yahoo listing
Haslemere town's listing

British opera companies
Opera in the United Kingdom
Musical groups established in 1984